Phalaris arundinacea, or reed canary grass, is a tall, perennial bunchgrass that commonly forms extensive single-species stands along the margins of lakes and streams and in wet open areas, with a wide distribution in Europe, Asia, northern Africa and North America. Other common names for the plant include gardener's-garters and ribbon grass in English, alpiste roseau in French, Rohrglanzgras in German, kusa-yoshi in Japanese, caniço-malhado in Portuguese, and hierba cinta and pasto cinto in Spanish.

Description
The stems can reach  in height. The leaf blades are usually green, but may be variegated. The panicles are up to 30 centimeters long. The spikelets are light green, often streaked with darker green or purple. This is a perennial grass which spreads underground by its thick rhizomes.

Uses
A number of cultivars of P. arundinacea have been selected for use as ornamental plants, including variegated (striped) cultivars – sometimes called ribbon grass – such as 'Castor' and 'Feesey'. The latter has a pink tinge to the leaves. When grown, although drought-tolerant, it likes abundant water and can even be grown as an aquatic plant.

Reed canary grass grows well on poor soil and contaminated industrial sites, and researchers at Teesside University's Contaminated Land & Water Centre have suggested it as the ideal candidate for phytoremediation in improving soil quality and biodiversity at brownfield sites.

The grass can also easily be turned into bricks or pellets for burning in biomass power stations. Furthermore, it provides fibers which find use in pulp and papermaking processes.

P. arundinacea is also planted as a hay crop or for forage.

This species of Phalaris may also be used as a source for the psychedelic drugs DMT, 5-MeO-DMT and 5-OH-DMT (bufotenin), as well as Hordenine and 5-MeO-NMT; however, N,N-DMT is considered most desirable. Although the concentrations of these compounds is lower than in other potential sources, such as Psychotria viridis and Mimosa tenuiflora, large enough quantities of the grass can be refined to make an ad hoc ayahuasca brew.

Ecology
In many places, P. arundinacea is an invasive species in wetlands, particularly in disturbed areas. It has been reported as an invasive weed in floodplains, riverside meadows, and other wetland habitat types around the world. When P. arundinacea invades a wetland, it inhibits native vegetation and reduces biological diversity. It alters the entire ecosystem. The grass propagates by seed and rhizome, and once established, is difficult to eradicate.

Distribution
P. arundinacea now has world-wide distribution. It is regarded as native to both North America and Eurasia, but this is debated and it appears that the populations in North America are made up of a mixture of cultivars of both those that were introduced from Europe and indigenous varieties.

Chemical properties
Specimens contain varying levels of hordenine and gramine.

Leaves of P. arundinacea contain DMT, 5-MeO-DMT and related compounds. Levels of beta-carbolines and hordenine have also been reported.

See also
Waterside hot water hay pellet furnace

References

External links

Flora Europaea: Phalaris arundinacea
USDA Plants Database: Phalaris arundinacea
Jepson Manual Treatment - taxonomy and distribution within California

Bunchgrasses of Africa
Bunchgrasses of Asia
Bunchgrasses of Europe
Bunchgrasses of North America
Flora of Korea
Garden plants of Asia
Garden plants of Europe
Garden plants of North America
Grasses of Canada
Grasses of the United States
Herbal and fungal hallucinogens
arundinacea
Phytoremediation plants
Plants described in 1753
Psychedelic tryptamine carriers
Taxa named by Carl Linnaeus